The Roman Catholic Diocese of Tulsa is a particular church of the Latin Church of the Roman Catholic Church in the Ecclesiastical province of Oklahoma City covering the eastern region of the U.S. state of Oklahoma. Its ecclesiastical territory includes all of 31 counties in eastern Oklahoma, including the most populous county of the group, Tulsa County. The resignation of Bishop Edward James Slattery was accepted on May 13, 2016, and David Konderla was named his successor.

History
The Catholic Church in Oklahoma was founded by French Benedictine monks who entered Indian Territory in 1875. St Gregory's Abbey in Shawnee owes its origins to those same Frenchmen.

Pope Paul VI erected Diocese of Tulsa on December 13, 1972, taking its present territory from the former Diocese of Oklahoma City-Tulsa. He simultaneously elevated the mother diocese to a metropolitan archdiocese and changed its title to Archdiocese of Oklahoma City. The official news and information publication of the diocese is The Eastern Oklahoma Catholic.

Bishops

Bishops of Tulsa
 Bernard J. Ganter (1972–1977), appointed Bishop of Beaumont
 Eusebius J. Beltran (1978–1992), appointed Archbishop of Oklahoma City
 Edward James Slattery (1993–2016)
 David Konderla (2016–present)

Other priests of this diocese who became bishops
Peter Bryan Wells, appointed titular Archbishop and nuncio in 2016
Daniel Henry Mueggenborg, appointed auxiliary bishop of Seattle in 2017

Cathedral

Liturgical institute
Te Deum Institute of Sacred Liturgy

Newspaper

Education
The superintendent of the diocese is David Dean.

High schools
Bishop Kelley High School, Tulsa
Cascia Hall Preparatory School, Tulsa

Ecclesiastical province
See: List of the Catholic bishops of the United States#Province of Oklahoma City

See also

 Catholic Church by country
 Catholic Church in the United States
 Ecclesiastical Province of Oklahoma City
 Global organisation of the Catholic Church
 List of Roman Catholic archdioceses (by country and continent)
 List of Roman Catholic dioceses (alphabetical) (including archdioceses)
 List of Roman Catholic dioceses (structured view) (including archdioceses)
 List of the Catholic dioceses of the United States
 Roman Catholic Archdiocese of Oklahoma City

References

External links

Roman Catholic Diocese of Tulsa Official Site
Archdiocese of Oklahoma City official website

 
Roman Catholic Ecclesiastical Province of Oklahoma City
Catholic Church in Oklahoma
Tulsa
Tulsa
Christian organizations established in 1972